Keema is a village in Võru Parish, Võru County, in southeastern Estonia.

Opera singer Väino Puura was born in Keema village.

References

 

Villages in Võru County